Edmund Meyricke may refer to:

 Edmund Meyrick (1636–1713), Welsh cleric and benefactor of Jesus College, Oxford
 Edmund Meyricke (MP) (died 1666), Welsh politician